State Route 77 (SR-77) is a state highway in the U.S. state of Utah, running west and south from Springville across I-15 to SR-147 in rural Utah County.

Route description
SR-77 begins at an intersection with SR-147 north of Benjamin. It heads north on 3200 West through Lake Shore, and after a few turns near the shore of Utah Lake, and a bridge over the Spanish Fork, ends up eastbound on 4000 South. The route enters Springville as it curves into 3900 South, crossing I-15 and becoming 400 South in that city's grid. After crossing over the Union Pacific Railroad's Provo Subdivision (ex-D&RGW), SR-77 ends at US-89 (Main Street) near downtown Springville. The entire route is within the flat Utah Valley, rich farmland that was once the bed of Lake Bonneville. In addition, the portion between I-15 and US-89 is part of the National Highway System.

History
The state legislature designated State Route 228 in 1941, beginning at SR-147 west of Spanish Fork and heading northwest on Palmyra Drive via Palmyra and south on 3200 West to SR-115 at Benjamin. A new State Route 77 was created by the State Road Commission in 1962, connecting the planned I-15 to SR-1 (US-89) in Springville. The legislature deleted SR-228 in 1969, but the north–south piece became part of an extension of SR-77, along with a portion of 4000 South connecting the I-15/SR-77 interchange to former SR-228.

Major intersections

References

077
 077
Springville, Utah